Rani Mukerji is an Indian actress known for her work in Hindi films. She made her screen debut with a parallel lead role in Biyer Phool (1996), a Bengali film directed by her father Ram Mukherjee. Her first leading role was that of a rape victim in the 1996 social drama Raja Ki Aayegi Baraat, for which she won a special jury trophy at the Screen Awards. In 1998 she received wider recognition for her role alongside Aamir Khan in the action film Ghulam. Later that year, her breakthrough role as the romantic interest of Shah Rukh Khan's character in the romantic drama Kuch Kuch Hota Hai earned Mukerji her first Filmfare Award in the Best Supporting Actress category. She followed this initial success by portraying the leading lady in several films, including Hello Brother (1999) and Nayak: The Real Hero (2001), none of which helped propel her career forward.

Mukerji's career prospects improved in 2002 when she played the lead role of a medical student in Yash Raj Films' Saathiya, a romantic drama that gained her a Filmfare Critics Award for Best Actress. For her roles in the 2004 romantic comedy Hum Tum and the composite drama Yuva, Mukerji became the only actress to win both the Filmfare Award for Best Actress and Best Supporting Actress, respectively, in the same year. Also that year, she starred in Veer-Zaarathe highest-grossing Bollywood film of the year. In 2005 she garnered praise for portraying a blind, deaf and mute woman in the drama Black, and starred in the critically acclaimed fantasy film Paheli. She also played a con woman that year in the crime comedy film Bunty Aur Babli. For her performance in Black, she was awarded the Best Actress and Best Actress (Critics) trophies at Filmfare. The following year, she played an unhappily married woman in the musical romantic drama Kabhi Alvida Naa Kehnaone of the top-grossing Bollywood films in domestic and overseas markets.

Following a leading role in the moderately financially successful family drama Ta Ra Rum Pum (2007), Mukerji starred primarily in films produced by Yash Raj Films for the next two years. None of these films performed well at the box office, after which she featured as a talent judge for the Sony Entertainment Television reality show Dance Premier League (2009). The role of a headstrong television reporter in the 2011 semi-biographical thriller No One Killed Jessica earned her another Best Supporting Actress trophy at Filmfare, and the film proved to be her first box office success in four years. In 2012, she portrayed a grieving mother in the supernatural thriller Talaash: The Answer Lies Within and in 2014 she appeared as a police officer in the crime thriller Mardaani. Following a four-year hiatus, Mukerji played a woman suffering from Tourette syndrome in Hichki (2018), which ranks among Hindi cinema's highest-grossing female-led films. She reprised her role in Mardaani 2 (2019), a sequel to Mardaani, which was a critical and commercial success.

Films

Television

Documentary

Music videos

Footnotes 
She played a single character who has two different names.
She played the role of a woman who masquerades as a man.
Bombay Talkies consisted of four short films, directed by Anurag Kashyap, Dibakar Banerjee, Zoya Akhtar and Karan Johar.

See also 
 List of awards and nominations received by Rani Mukerji

References

External links 
 
 Rani Mukerji on Bollywood Hungama

Indian filmographies
Actress filmographies